Love and Light is the seventh album by Count Basic released in 2007

Track listing

"Last Man on Earth" - 3:15
"Love and Light" - 3:51
"No Visible Scars" - 3:24
"Supa Dupa" - 3:44
"Love Thang" - 3:11
"I Wanna Get Off" - 4:55
"Get By" - 3:22
"Nobody Loves Me Better" - 3:08
"Right All The Time" - 3:39
"Sun Shines On You" - 2:58
"Sir Karl" - 5:01
"People These Days" - 3:11
"Back To Nice" - 5:44

Count Basic albums
2007 albums